James E. Post is an American author and professor who holds the John F. Smith, Jr. Professorship in Management at Boston University.

In 2010, James E. Post was awarded the Aspen Institute Faculty Pioneers and Dissertation Proposal Award.

External links
 https://www.bu.edu/questrom/faculty-research/faculty-directory/james-post/

References

Boston University faculty
American male writers
Living people
Year of birth missing (living people)
Place of birth missing (living people)